Group A of the 1999 Fed Cup Asia/Oceania Zone Group I was one of two pools in the Asia/Oceania Zone Group I of the 1999 Fed Cup. Five teams competed in a round robin competition, with the top team advancing to the Group I play-off, the winner of which would advance to World Group II Play-offs, and the bottom team being relegated down to 2000 Group II.

Chinese Taipei vs. Indonesia

India vs. Uzbekistan

Chinese Taipei vs. India

Thailand vs. Uzbekistan

Chinese Taipei vs. Uzbekistan

Indonesia vs. Thailand

Chinese Taipei vs. Thailand

India vs. Indonesia

India vs. Thailand

Indonesia vs. Uzbekistan

  placed last in the pool, and thus was relegated to Group II in 2000, where they achieved advancement back into Group I for 2001.

See also
Fed Cup structure

References

External links
 Fed Cup website

1999 Fed Cup Asia/Oceania Zone